College is a 2008 American comedy film starring Drake Bell, Andrew Caldwell, and Kevin Covais and directed by first-time director Deb Hagan. It was released on August 29, 2008, by MGM. The story follows three high school seniors, who spend the weekend visiting Fieldmont University for freshman orientation, and get involved in various antics. The film garnered  negative reviews from critics and grossed $6 million worldwide against its $7 million budget.

Plot
After Kevin, a high school senior, is dumped by his girlfriend Gina for being too boring, he does not want to go to the freshman orientation weekend at Fieldmont University, which they had planned to attend together. However, Kevin's best friends Carter and Morris convince him that the weekend away will help get his mind off her, having been told by their friend Fletcher about a weekend visiting his brother at college in which he got laid by three college chicks at once. This convinces Kevin to go to Fieldmont for the freshmen orientation to prove to his ex-girlfriend that he can be fun instead of boring. Once they are there, one of the rowdiest fraternities on campus pretends to recruit them as pledges in return for granting them access to the college party scene. Though forced to put up with the disgusting antics of fraternity brothers Teague, Bearcat, and Cooper, the guys meet sorority girls Kendall, Heather, and Amy, and sparks fly. But once Teague feels threatened by Kevin's new relationship with Kendall, who once dated Teague, he takes the pre-frosh humiliation to a greater level and make their lives miserable and start bullying them out of their college. The guys decide to fight back and get payback for ruining their weekend, and Morris's college scholarship, and Kevin's chance to attend Fieldmont. During the climax, Teague is arrested, Bearcat is superglued to a toilet, and Cooper is duct taped to a statue naked. After Kevin sent Gina a video of him having fun at a party at Fieldmont, she asks him to get back together with her, but he refuses. Kevin tells his friends about a new college weekend they can visit; Morris is being punished by his parents for messing up his college scholarship, but he says he can sneak out. All three of them decide to go.

Cast

Production
Many of the scenes of the actors at university are filmed on the campus of Tulane University in New Orleans and Grace King High School in Metairie in January 2007.

Release

Reception
College was panned by critics. The site's consensus reads: "A pale imitation of the raunchy frat comedies of old, College aims low and misses." On Metacritic, the film scored a 15 out of 100, based on 11 critics, indicating "overwhelming dislike".

Gary Goldstein of the Los Angeles Times criticized the "grab-bag script" for emphasizing vulgar humor and bad taste over "wit, charm and originality", calling it "a tedious, by-the-numbers raunch-fest that exists strictly because it can." Marc Savlov of The Austin Chronicle found the film "so persistently loud and annoying that it single-handedly makes the case for drugging yourself with a roofie, Nembutal, and GHB cocktail (add bitters to taste) prior to entering the theatre." Entertainment Weeklys Owen Gleiberman rated the movie with a "C−" grade, saying "Friendly yet toothless, College musters little energy even as anarchic-party-movie nostalgia." Nathan Rabin of The A.V. Club gave it a "D−" rating, saying "[I]t's a joyless misfire determined to deliver the time-tested staples of the college comedy in the most perfunctory, least satisfying manner imaginable."

Box office
The film was released on August 29, 2008, in 2,123 theaters. It made US$2.6 million over the Labor Day weekend. The film has grossed an estimated $4.7 million in the U.S. and Canada and $1.6 million in other territories for a total gross of $6.3 million worldwide.

DVD release
The film was released on Region 1 DVD on January 27, 2009. The DVD includes both the Theatrical and Unrated versions of the film as well as a Gag Reel.

References

External links
 
 

2008 films
2008 comedy films
2008 directorial debut films
2000s American films
2000s English-language films
2000s teen comedy films
American comedy films
Films about fraternities and sororities
Films set in universities and colleges
Films shot in New Orleans
Metro-Goldwyn-Mayer films